Colin Edward Penter (born 20 July 1955) is a former Australian cricketer who played for Western Australia between 1979 and 1980.

He played eight matches for Western Australia Colts against other states' colts sides before making his first-class for Western Australia against New South Wales in October 1979, scoring 112 on debut and featuring in a partnership of 132 runs with Tony Mann (52*). He made a half-century in his third match, against Tasmania, but failed to make more than 50 runs in any of his further innings, playing his final match against the touring India national cricket team in November 1980, scoring 42* in his only innings.

His brother Kevan Penter also played for Western Australia Colts between 1973 and 1975, and is the current president of the University Cricket Club in the Western Australian Grade Cricket competition.

References

External links

1955 births
Living people
Australian cricketers
People from Albany, Western Australia
Western Australia cricketers
Cricketers from Western Australia